Cubana may refer to:
 a woman born in Cuba
 Cubana de Aviación, an airline of Cuba
 Cubana, West Virginia, a town in the United States

See also 
 Cubano (disambiguation)